"Perfect Combination" / "Heartbreak Look" is a song performed by Stacy Lattisaw and Johnny Gill, issued as the lead single from their collaboration album Perfect Combination. Released in 1984, the single peaked at #75 on the Billboard Hot 100; becoming Gill's first single to appear on the chart.

Chart positions

References

External links
 
 
 

1984 singles
Cotillion Records singles
Johnny Gill songs
Stacy Lattisaw songs
Song recordings produced by Preston Glass
Song recordings produced by Narada Michael Walden
Songs written by Preston Glass
Songs written by Narada Michael Walden
1984 songs
Male–female vocal duets